Audley End Airfield is located to the south west of Saffron Walden near to Saffron Walden County High School in the Uttlesford district of Essex, England. It serves general aviation aircraft and has a grass runway.

Airfield
The airfield's landing strip is 752m long and the landing fee is £5.00. It is north east of London and has no facilities and a small terminal building.

References

Airports in Essex